Wojciech Łazarek (born 4 October 1937) is a Polish footballer who played as forward in the late 1950s and early 1960s and, starting in 1964, until his retirement in 2006, embarked on a 42-year career as a renowned trainer and manager entrusted, between 1986 and 1989, with the key responsibility of selecting and training players for the Poland national football team.

A native of Łódź, Wojciech Łazarek played for Start Łódź, ŁKS Łódź and Lechia Gdańsk.

He managed Lechia Gdańsk, Olimpia Elbląg, Bałtyk Gdynia, Zawisza Bydgoszcz, Lech Poznań, Trelleborgs FF, Poland, Hapoel Kfar Saba, ŁKS Łódź, El-Masry, Al-Ettifaq, Aluminium Konin, Hapoel Tayibe, Wisła Kraków, Widzew Łódź, Śląsk Wrocław, Jagiellonia Białystok, Narew Ostrołęka and Sudan national team.

References

Polish footballers
ŁKS Łódź players
Lechia Gdańsk players
Polish football managers
Lechia Gdańsk managers
Lech Poznań managers
Śląsk Wrocław managers
Jagiellonia Białystok managers
Poland national football team managers
Trelleborgs FF managers
Widzew Łódź managers
Footballers from Łódź
People from Łódź Voivodeship (1919–1939)
1937 births
Living people
Ettifaq FC managers
ŁKS Łódź managers
Zawisza Bydgoszcz managers
Sudan national football team managers
Olimpia Elbląg managers
Association football forwards
Polish expatriate football managers
Polish expatriate sportspeople in Egypt
Polish expatriate sportspeople in Sudan
Polish expatriate sportspeople in Saudi Arabia
Polish expatriate sportspeople in Israel
Expatriate football managers in Sudan
Expatriate football managers in Egypt
Expatriate football managers in Israel
Al Masry SC managers
Expatriate football managers in Sweden
Polish expatriate sportspeople in Sweden
Saudi Professional League managers
Egyptian Premier League managers